Richard Perry is an American music producer.

Richard Perry may also refer to:
Richard C. Perry (born 1955),  hedge investor in Perry Capital
Rich Perry (born 1949), jazz musician and saxophonist
Rick Perry (born 1950), United States Secretary of Energy

See also
Richard Parry (disambiguation)
Richard Perre, Member of Parliament (MP) for Wycombe